Francisco Martínez (born 20 August 1976) is a Mexican boxer. He competed in the men's lightweight event at the 1996 Summer Olympics. At the 1996 Summer Olympics, he lost to Michael Strange of Canada.

References

External links
 

1976 births
Living people
Mexican male boxers
Olympic boxers of Mexico
Boxers at the 1996 Summer Olympics
Place of birth missing (living people)
Lightweight boxers